Ear instillation is the process of introducing otic medication or other liquids into the ear canal. Proper care is needed in delivering such liquids.

Indications for ear instillation

 patients with otitis media
 patients with otitis externa
 patients with impacted cerumen (earwax)
 patients with foreign body obstruction

Contraindications for ear instillation
 hypersensitivity to the solution.
 perforated eardrum

Routes of administration
Ear